Harry MacElhone (1890 – 1958) was an early 20th century bartender, most famous for his role at Harry's New York Bar in Paris, which he bought in 1923.

MacElhone was born in Dundee, Scotland, on 16 June 1890, He began working at Ciro's Club in London after World War I and published Harry of Ciro's ABC of Mixing Cocktails in 1921.  Ciro's is also where he began working on his earliest version of the White Lady which included gin, Crème de menthe, Triple sec and lemon juice.

He also published Barflies and Cocktails, and later worked at the Plaza Hotel in New York. He is often credited with inventing many other cocktails, including the Bloody Mary, sidecar, the monkey gland, the boulevardier, and an early form of the French 75. As of 2022, his descendants continued to run Harry's Bar.

References

Bartenders
1890 births
1958 deaths
People from Dundee
Scottish emigrants to the United States
Writers from New York City
Scottish food writers